Al Qanat (the Independent in English) is an internet news media outlet based in Beirut, Lebanon. It offers viewers news only in Arabic throughout Lebanon and through satellite to other countries in the Arab world.

References

External links
 Al Qanat Web Site (Arabic)

Arabic-language websites
Lebanese news websites
Mass media in Beirut